Nikolaos Roumeliotis (born ) is a retired Greek male volleyball player. He was part of the Greece men's national volleyball team. He competed with the national team at the 2004 Summer Olympics in Athens, Greece.

Personal
Roumeliotis is married to the former volleyball player Vasso Karantasiou, and they have one son.

See also
 Greece at the 2004 Summer Olympics

References

External links
profile at greekvolley.gr

1978 births
Living people
Greek men's volleyball players
Olympiacos S.C. players
Aris V.C. players
E.A. Patras players
Volleyball players at the 2004 Summer Olympics
Olympic volleyball players of Greece
Sportspeople from Patras